Sullivan is a city in Hamilton Township, Sullivan County, Indiana, United States. The population was 4,249 at the 2010 census. It is part of the Terre Haute Metropolitan Statistical Area. The city is the county seat of Sullivan County.

History
The Sullivan post office has been in operation since 1843.

Geography
Sullivan is located at  (39.096888, -87.406447).

Demographics

2010 census
As of the census of 2010, there were 4,249 people, 1,835 households, and 1,073 families living in the city. The racial makeup of the city was 97.7% White, 0.1% African American, 0.4% Native American, 0.2% Asian, 0.4% from other races, and 1.2% from two or more races. Hispanic or Latino of any race were 1.4% of the population.

There were 1,835 households, of which 29.4% had children under the age of 18 living with them, 39.2% were married couples living together, 14.3% had a female householder with no husband present, 5.0% had a male householder with no wife present, and 41.5% were non-families. 37.1% of all households were made up of individuals, and 18.1% had someone living alone who was 65 years of age or older. The average household size was 2.27 and the average family size was 2.96.

The median age in the city was 39.8 years. 23.8% of residents were under the age of 18; 9.3% were between the ages of 18 and 24; 23.4% were from 25 to 44; 25% were from 45 to 64; and 18.5% were 65 years of age or older. The gender makeup of the city was 46.3% male and 53.7% female.

2000 census
As of the census of 2000, there were 4,617 people, 1,958 households, and 1,176 families living in the city. The racial makeup of the city was 97.92% White, 0.50% African American, 0.37% Native American, 0.24% Asian, 0.13% from other races, and 0.84% from two or more races. Hispanic or Latino of any race were 0.82% of the population.

There were 1,958 households, out of which 28.5% had children under the age of 18 living with them, 45.0% were married couples living together, 11.6% had a female householder with no husband present, and 39.9% were non-families. 36.0% of all households were made up of individuals, and 19.9% had someone living alone who was 65 years of age or older. The average household size was 2.26 and the average family size was 2.95.

In the city, the population was spread out, with 23.5% under the age of 18, 8.9% from 18 to 24, 25.5% from 25 to 44, 22.0% from 45 to 64, and 20.2% who were 65 years of age or older. The median age was 39 years. For every 100 females, there were 83.9 males. For every 100 females age 18 and over, there were 77.5 males.

The median income for a household in the city was $26,115, and the median income for a family was $35,042. Males had a median income of $28,773 versus $21,992 for females. The per capita income for the city was $17,717. About 13.6% of families and 16.6% of the population were below the poverty line, including 22.2% of those under age 18 and 11.0% of those age 65 or over.

Education
The town is served by the Southwest School Corporation, and students go to Sullivan High School.

Sullivan has a public library, a branch of the Sullivan County Public Library.

Notable people
Will H. Hays (1879–1954) - Chairman of the Republican National Committee (1918–21), Postmaster General of the United States (1921-22), President of the Motion Picture Producers and Distributors of America (1922–45) and namesake of the movie industry's Hays Code.
Nelson Poynter (1903–1978) - Newspaperman and founder of the Poynter Institute.
Antoinette Dakin Leach (April 3, 1859 – June 11, 1922) was an American lawyer and a women's rights pioneer who was an active organizer on behalf of women's suffrage in Indiana. When the Greene-Sullivan Circuit Court denied Leach's petition for admission to the bar in 1893, her successful appeal to the Indiana Supreme Court, In re Petition of Leach, broke the gender barrier for admission to the bar in Indiana, securing the right for women to practice law in the state. The landmark decision, a progressive one for the time, also set a precedent that was used in 1897 as a test case to give Indiana women the right to vote, although the voting rights challenge in Gougar v Timberlake was unsuccessful. Leach was also an active politician and a supporter of women's suffrage who favored a constitutional amendment to secure women's right to vote. The Wooster, Ohio, native and married mother of two was trained as a lawyer and stenographer. She began her legal career as court reporter for the Greene-Sullivan Circuit Court in Sullivan, Indiana. After Leach was admitted to the bar in 1883, she maintained a general law practice in Sullivan and in Indianapolis, Indiana, from 1911 until her retirement in 1917. Leach also held several leadership roles in local and state politics, including membership in the Republican Party and serving as a delegate to the party's state convention in 1896, before joining the Progressive Party when it endorsed equal suffrage. Leach served for three years as Sullivan County chair of Progressive Party and for twelve years as president of the Sullivan County Bar Association. She was admitted to Indiana State Bar Association in 1909. Leach served as a State Organizer for the National American Suffrage Association and ran an active but unsuccessful campaign for state representative in 1910. In addition, she founded the Woman Citizen, a monthly publication of Indiana's Equal Suffrage Association, in 1911 and served as its editor for two years. Two plaques in the rotunda of the Sullivan County Courthouse commemorate Leach's life and her successful effort to secure women the right to practice law in Indiana.
Paul Dresser (1857-1906) - Late 19th century singer, songwriter and comedic actor. Wrote one of the best-selling songs of the 19th century, "On the Banks of the Wabash, Far Away".

References

External links

 

Cities in Indiana
Cities in Sullivan County, Indiana
County seats in Indiana
Terre Haute metropolitan area
Sundown towns in Indiana